Morad Ali may refer to:

 Balutban
 Meleh-ye Balut
 Morad Ali, Lorestan
 Morad Ali, Hirmand, Sistan and Baluchestan Province
 Morad Ali-ye Olya, West Azerbaijan Province
 Morad Ali-ye Sofla, West Azerbaijan Province